Go Fish is an American sitcom television series that aired on NBC from June 19 to July 3, 2001. The series was created by Adam Herz (a screenwriter for the American Pie film series), developed by Pam Brady (a consultant writer for South Park) and starred Kieran Culkin in his first regular role in a television series. A total of five episodes were produced, leaving one of those five unaired.

Premise
Andy Troutner (nicknamed "Fish") (Kieran Culkin) is beginning his first year of high school at Westlake High. Joining him are his two best friends Henry Krakowski (Kyle Sabihy), the so-called wise one of the group and Hazard (Taylor Handley), whose personality is defined by his name. His older brother Pete (Will Friedle) is a recent college graduate who gets a job at Fish's school. Rounding out the people in Fish's school are Ernie Hopkins (Andy Dick), their overdramatic drama teacher, Laura Eastwood (Kristin Lehman), their attractive English teacher and Jess Riley (Katherine Ellis), a beautiful girl that Fish has affections for. His home life consisted of his not so smart brain surgeon dad (Joe Flaherty) and his homemaker mother (Molly Cheek). Future stars Adam Brody and Joanna Garcia made guest appearances.

Cast
 Kieran Culkin as Andy "Fish" Troutner
 Will Friedle as Pete Troutner
 Kyle Sabihy as Henry "Krak" Krakowski
 Taylor Handley as Hazard
 Kristin Lehman as Laura Eastwood
 Joe Flaherty as Dr. Frank Troutner
 Molly Cheek as Annie Troutner
 Andy Dick as Ernie Hopkins
 Katherine Ellis as Jess Riley

Episodes

References

External links

2000s American high school television series
2000s American teen sitcoms
2001 American television series debuts
2001 American television series endings
English-language television shows
NBC original programming
Television series about teenagers
Television series by ABC Studios
Television shows set in Los Angeles